Yiyang (548) is a Type 054A frigate of the People's Liberation Army Navy. She was commissioned on 26 October 2010.

Development and design 

The Type 054A carries HQ-16 medium-range air defence missiles and anti-submarine missiles in a vertical launching system (VLS) system. The HQ-16 has a range of up to 50 km, with superior range and engagement angles to the Type 054's HQ-7. The Type 054A's VLS uses a hot launch method; a shared common exhaust system is sited between the two rows of rectangular launching tubes.

The four AK-630 close-in weapon systems (CIWS) of the Type 054 were replaced with two Type 730 CIWS on the Type 054A. The autonomous Type 730 provides improved reaction time against close-in threats.

Construction and career 
Yiyang was launched on 17 November 2009 at the China State Shipbuilding Corporation in Shanghai. Commissioned on 26 October 2010.

On November 7, 2015, Yiyang, Qiandaohu, and Jinan held a six-hour joint exercise with the US Navy. This was the first time that China and the US had joined forces in the Atlantic. Exercise. The exercise was conducted in the Atlantic waters southeast of Mayport Harbor, Florida. The US ships involved in the exercise were guided missile destroyers USS Mason and USS Stout and guided missile cruiser USS Monterey.

Gallery

References 

2009 ships
Ships built in China
Type 054 frigates